The 2006–07 Texas A&M Aggies men's basketball team represented Texas A&M University in the 2006–07 college basketball season. The team was led by third-year head coach Billy Gillispie, who afterward left the Aggies to coach at the University of Kentucky.  The Aggies finished 27–7 (13–3 in the Big 12), achieved the highest national ranking in school history to that point, and advanced to the NCAA Sweet Sixteen.  This season was Acie Law IV's senior season, after which he would become the highest draft pick in A&M history at number 11 to the Atlanta Hawks.  The Aggies also won the inaugural Shelby Metcalf Classic.

Recruiting

Players

Roster

Source:

Schedule

|-
!colspan=9| Regular season

|-
!colspan=9| Postseason

Source:

References

External links
Official website

Texas A&M Aggies men's basketball seasons
Texas AandM
Texas A and M Aggies men's b
Texas A and M Aggies men's b
Texas AandM